The Heliconian Club of Toronto is an association of women involved in the arts and letters based in Toronto, Canada. It operates out of Heliconian Hall located in Yorkville. In existence for over 110 years, the Heliconian Club remains steadfast in its commitment to women living and working in the arts.

Today the Club has six sections – Drama, Dance, Humanities, Literature, Music and Visual Arts – open to all professional women working in or supporting the arts. The Club runs a Literary Lecture Series, founded in 1996, a Concert Series in its eighth year and a Salon Series featuring speakers from across the arts spectrum. These are open to the public, with the exception of the Literary Lecture Series which is by subscription only.

A key initiative of the Club over the last decade has been to establish artistic residencies for young female artists setting out on a professional career in Music, Literature, Visual Arts, Drama and Dance. The Club offers the musician, dancer, and dramatist rehearsal space at the Club and an evening in which they can perform their artistic projects at the Club before a paying audience. The Visual Artist is given a solo show of her works at the end of the residency in June of each year and is able to attend the Life Drawing Sessions at the Monday Sketch Club free of charge. The Writer in residence is given a subscription to the Literary Lecture Series and the opportunity during her residency to share her current writing project with members of the Club.

History

Mary Hewitt Smart (later Shenstone), a teacher of singing at the Toronto Conservatory of Music, had helped establish the Women's Musical Club of Toronto in 1899 and now, in the early 1900s, was contemplating a more ambitious project. She wanted to bring together women living and working in all the arts – not just music – for social interaction and intellectual stimulation. To that end, she and 59 fellow artists attended a formal meeting at the Teapot Inn on Wednesday, January 20, 1909. On that day, the Heliconian Club was born with Mary Smart as its first president. It was named for Mount Helicon, mythical abode of the Muses.

The founding members were professionals in painting, music, literature and drama. The first Vice President was painter Elizabeth McGillivray Knowles. Charter members (founding members) included Jean Blewett (poet); Bessie Bonsall Barron (singer), Mona Bates (pianist), Estelle Kerr (painter), Ellen Elliott (publisher), Mary Dignam (founder of the Women's Art Association of Canada (WAAC)), Emma Scott Raiff Naismith (dramatist), Jessie Alexander Roberts (dramatist), Ida McLean (singer), and Marjory MacMurchy – aka Lady Willison (journalist & author). Other early active members were: Lina Adamson, Maude Wilks, Katherine Hale (writer), Mrs. J.V. Fairburn, as well as visual artists Dorothy Stevens, Mabel Cawthra, Marion Long, Rody Kenny Courtice, Isabel McLaughlin and Kathleen Daly.

Another impetus to creating the Heliconian Club was the fact that women were excluded from The Arts and Letters Club of Toronto, founded in 1908. Membership was by invitation only and members were required to have distinguished themselves in their particular métier. 
 
The early Heliconians resembled nomads, giving performances, holding meetings and hosting receptions for visiting artists in several different locations before settling in a permanent home. In 1914, members met in a suite of rooms over a bank at the corner of Yonge and Grosevenor streets. Better accommodation was found at 617 Yonge Street; later the Club moved again to a large room over a closed movie house at 801 Yonge St. At the Club's annual meeting of 1923, the acquisition of permanent headquarters was discussed and members were asked to keep an eye open for a suitable building. Shortly afterward, artist Emily Louise Elliot spotted a "For Sale" sign on an apparently empty church on Hazelton Ave. It was the former Olivet Baptist Church, then owned by the Painters' Union, whose asking price was $8,000. In July, 1923, the Club acquired the building with a down payment of $2,000 and the prospect of a $5,000 bill for renovations and structural repairs. Diligent fundraising enabled the work to be done. The mortgage was discharged in 1931.

In its earliest iteration the Club hosted receptions for artists visiting Toronto, as well as mounted theatricals, skits, concerts, art exhibits, arranged art lessons and held a variety of social events such as luncheons and dinners. One of its specialties was extravagant tableaux vivants involving the talents of all of the members including musicians, artists, actors, and writers.

Hall
Heliconian Hall, as it is now known, is in the Yorkville district of Toronto on the east side of Hazelton Avenue and north of Scollard Street. The area is home to many art galleries, boutiques and picturesque Edwardian and Victorian homes.

The building was erected in 1876. Its architecture is Carpenter's Gothic, with a board and batten exterior and a unique carved rose window with drip molding on the west façade. It is one of very few board-and-batten buildings still in use in Ontario. The building is protected under Part IV of the Ontario Heritage Act, designated by the City of Toronto since 1973. In 1983 the Toronto Historical Board recognized it with an appropriate plaque as "the oldest building" in the Yorkville area. In 1990 the Heliconian Hall Foundation was founded as a vehicle to acquire funds for the preservation and restoration of what is often called the gem of Yorkville. Heliconian Hall was designated a National Historic Sites of Canada in 2008 due to its distinctive architecture and its association with the Heliconian Club.

Other noteworthy architectural features include the square, flat-roofed tower, asymmetrically located on the building's southern elevation, two symmetrical steeply gabled entrance porches, and an arcade of narrow-pointed arched windows. The main hall has a vaulted ceiling, a low stage and a fireplace. Due to its excellent acoustics, the venue is in high demand for concerts and other performances. In addition, there is a small meeting room beside the hall with a bar and a kitchen. The hall may be rented for events and performances.

Current activities

While the Heliconian Club remains true to its objective as a forum for interaction among women in the arts, it has also evolved. Club events attract participants from across the city: the Monday Sketch Group, founded by artist and teacher Erma Lennox Sutcliffe in the early 1970s is vigorous. The Literary Lecture Series, founded by Janet L'Heureux and Jocelyn Paul in the mid-1990s, is consistently sold out. Since it was initiated, more than 170 exceptional Canadian authors have been featured. An annual concert series of varied programmes featuring the Clubs' high-caliber performers is another well-ensconced tradition. Each month member artists present art exhibitions in the hall for public viewing; exhibitions include drawings, paintings, mixed media, found objects, textile art, photography and occasionally sculpture.

Notable members

A handsome, historic building alone does not enable a club to survive for 100 years. The strength, vitality and longevity of the Heliconian Club comes from its many dedicated and distinguished members whose reputation and accomplishments are not limited to Toronto but recognized across Canada. Many early Heliconians were trailblazers in their areas of expertise.

Seven Heliconians have received the country's highest honour: the Order of Canada

1.	Dora Mavor Moore (1888–1979), actor and director who was instrumental in establishing Canadian professional theatre and has an annual award named in her honour

2.	Marjorie Wilkins Campbell (1901–1986), a writer who also twice won the Governor General's Award

3.	Isabel McLaughlin (1903–2002), visual artist, patron and philanthropist

4.	Edna Staebler (1906-2006), prolific writer at Maclean's and Chatelaine magazines

5.	Francess Halpenny (1919–2017), editor at University of Toronto Press, Dean of U of T faculty of Library Science

6.	Dorreen Hall (1921 – ), violinist and music educator who brought Orff method of teaching to Canada

7.	Lois Marshall (1924–1997), soprano

Other notable members are listed below

Mary Hiester Reid (1854-1921) - painter
Jessie Alexander Roberts (1864-1955) – famous elocutionist and author of Platform Sketches 
Susie Frances Harrison (1859–1931 or 1935) – writer under the name “Seranus” and composer
Jean Blewett (1862–1934) – poet and writer 
Virna Sheard (1862–1943) – poet and novelist 
Florence Helena McGillivray (1864-1938) – painter
Elizabeth McGillivray Knowles (1866–1928) – romantic landscape painter
Emily Louise Orr Elliott (1867-1952) – artist, graphic designer, fashion designer
Mabel Cawthra (1871-1943) – painter and decorator active in the Arts and Crafts Movement
Katherine Hale (1874-1956) – prolific poet and writer of travel books
Lorrie Dunington-Grubb (1877–1945) – landscape architect
Mary Wrinch (1877-1969) – painter
Mazo de la Roche (1879-1961) – author of the famous Jalna novels
Estelle Muriel Kerr (1879-1971) – painter, illustrator and writer
Marion Long (1882-1970) – painter of military portraits, landscapes and still life
Dorothy Stevens (1888-1966) – etcher and portrait painter
Rody Kenny Courtice (1891-1973) – painter and teacher; member of the Canadian Group of Painters
Grace Morris Craig (1891-1987) - painter and writer
Yvonne McKague Housser (1897-1996) – painter often associated with the Group of Seven; member of Canadian Group of Painters
Jacobine Jones (1897-1976) – sculptor
Kathleen Daly (1898-1994) – landscape and portrait painter
Jane Mallett (1899-1984) – actor
Lorna McLean Sheard (1901-1983) – actor and theatrical director who created an Experimental Theatre Group at Hart House Theatre in the early 20th century
Alexandra Luke (1901-1967) – painter; Member of Painters 11
Mona Coxwell (1892-?) – writer, dramatist; published theatre periodical called “The Curtain Call” from 1929 to 1941; member of the Canadian Women’s Press Club
Isabel McLaughlin (1903 – 2002) – artist, patron and philanthropist; member of the Canadian Group of Painters
Claire Wallace (c.1900–1968) – journalist at the Toronto Star and the Canadian Broadcasting Corporation radio broadcaster
Ellen Elliot (1901-1973) – publisher and editor
Marie McPhedran (1900-1974) – writer; Governor General's Award winner
Byrne Hope Sanders (1902-1981) – journalist, editor of Chatelaine Magazine 1929 – 1952
Lotta Dempsey (1905 – 1988) – journalist; wrote for the Globe and Mail and columnist at the Toronto Star for many years
Ruby Mercer (1906-1999) – opera singer and founder of Opera Canada Magazine and writer
Muriel Stafford (1906-2004) – organist and choir master
Eleanor Beecroft (1906-2007) – actor
Helen Sewell (1906-2001) – painter and teacher
Margaret Aitken (1908-1980) – journalist at the Toronto Telegram and the Globe and Mail who later became a politician
Isabel LeBourdais (1909-2003) – journalist and author 
Hilda Kay Grant (1910-1996) – writer and artist
Kay Kritzwiser (1910-2009) art critic, feature writer at the Globe and Mail
Bronisława Michałowska aka Bronka Michalowska (1915-2015) – ceramicist
Pearl Palmason (1915 -2006) – violinist; first woman to play violin section of the Toronto Symphony Orchestra
(Aileen) Tyrell Morrow (1915-2005) – artist
Amelia Hall (1916-1984) – actor
Faith Wood Breen (1917-2005) – painter
Elizabeth Dingman (1918-2010) – journalist at several major newspapers including the Toronto Telegram
Jean Townsend-Field (1921-2006) – painter
Joanne Mazzoleni aka Edith Joanne Ivey (1924-2019) – opera singer and author; member of Heliconian Hall Foundation
Suzanne Mess (1928-2019) – costume designer
Margaret Keslering Weiers (1928 – 2018) – diplomat, author; worked at the Toronto Star from 1963 until 1991 as a reporter, feature writer and member of the editorial board
Patricia Rideout (Rosenberg) (1931-2006) – soprano
Mary Gardiner (1932 -2010) – composer, pianist, educator; founding member and former Chair of the Association of Canadian Women Composers
Maryon Kantaroff (1933-2019) – sculptor

References
Citations

Sources

MacKinnon, Donna Jean. Newsgirls, Gutsy Pioneers in Canada’s Newsrooms. Leaping Lion Books, 2017. 
Walboum, Samara. Ladies in Retirement, University of Toronto PhD Thesis, 2004.
Weiers, Margaret. “Toronto Heliconian Club: Women Living in the Arts 1909-2009” pamphlet, 2008.

External links
Official website of the Heliconian Club https://www.heliconianclub.org/

Arts organizations based in Canada
Organizations based in Ontario
1909 establishments in Ontario
Women in Ontario